Moni is a village in the Limassol District of Cyprus, located 2 km east of Pyrgos.

References

Communities in Limassol District